The Steel Electric-class ferries are a class of auto/passenger ferries that became part of the Washington State Ferry System when Puget Sound Navigation Company was acquired in 1951. They were built on San Francisco Bay for service on Southern Pacific and Northwestern Pacific Railroad routes across that bay.

History 

The Steel Electric-class ferries were built in 1927 for Southern Pacific Transportation Company service on San Francisco Bay.  After a decade of service on San Francisco Bay, they were idled by completion of the San Francisco–Oakland Bay Bridge in 1936 and the Golden Gate Bridge in 1937.

They were sold in 1940 to Puget Sound Navigation Company, also known as the "Black Ball Line".  Two of the ferries, the Santa Rosa and Fresno, renamed Enetai and Willapa respectively, were extensively rebuilt and had their engines replaced. They were converted into single-ended boats, which made them faster and more suitable for use on the Seattle–Bremerton ferry route. These modifications meant that they were no longer technically part of the "Steel Electric" class.
In 1951, the Steel Electrics and almost all of Black Ball's fleet was purchased by Washington State Ferries (WSF). In 1953, WSF replaced the car deck windows with portholes on all the Steel Electrics. In the 1980s the four remaining boats were given an overhaul and continued to serve until November 2007.

The six boats are now fairly different. The Enetai and Willapa were both converted into single-ended boats and had their engines replaced. The Klickitat was rebuilt before the other ferries and has a shorter cabin and lacks an elevator. The remaining three all have elevators.

Vessels and engines
These vessels uses hybrid diesel-electric engines.

Willapa

Keel was laid on 8 November 1926, and launching was 16 January 1927. The ferry was christened Fresno by Miss Shirley Harding, daughter of Southern Pacific's engineer of standards. The $525,000 ferry went into service between San Francisco and Oakland, California in April with an all-electric galley for the dining room and capacity for 100 automobiles. Fresno was disabled when heavy seas shorted the electrical power plant during a stormy January 1932 evening bay crossing from San Francisco to Oakland. The ferry drifted nearly to Alcatraz Island before tugs were able to rig a tow to Oakland. After 28 years in Puget Sound, Washington State declared Willapa surplus in 1968. After years of languishing, she was to be turned into a storage warehouse under her old name, Fresno. However the owners, Parker Oceanic, never really did much work on her; she was sold to NYMET Holdings, a salvage firm, and scrapped in Stockton, California in 2009.

Klickitat

Keel was laid on 15 November 1926, launching was 5 March 1927, and service between San Francisco and Oakland began in May. The ferry was christened Stockton by Miss Louise Shoup, daughter of Southern Pacific's president, Paul Shoup.

Illahee

Launching was 23 March 1927, and service between San Francisco and Oakland began in June. The ferry was christened Lake Tahoe by Miss Helen Dyer, daughter of Southern Pacific's general manager. Lake Tahoe was involved in a minor collision with the Southern Pacific ferry Oakland in fog on 14 August 1943. This ferry made the last Southern Pacific San Francisco Bay auto ferry run on 16 May 1940. The tug Commissioner towed this ferry out of San Francisco Bay on 10 August 1940 bound for Puget Sound. The tow line broke off Trinidad, California and the ferry drifted for 36 hours until it could be towed to Humboldt Bay for emergency repairs before continuing northward.

Enetai

This ferry was built as Santa Rosa to inaugurate Northwestern Pacific auto ferry service on 1 July 1927 across the mouth of San Francisco Bay between San Francisco and a new terminal at the foot of Mission Street in Sausalito. After 28 years in Puget Sound, Washington State declared Enetai surplus in 1968.  She was purchased for restoration and is now the headquarters of Hornblower Yachts in San Francisco, California under her old name, Santa Rosa.

Nisqually

This ferry was built as Mendocino to inaugurate Northwestern Pacific service across the mouth of San Francisco Bay.

Quinault

This ferry was built as Redwood Empire to inaugurate Northwestern Pacific service across the mouth of San Francisco Bay. The tug Commissioner towed this ferry out of San Francisco Bay on 10 August 1940 bound for Puget Sound.

Withdrawal from service

Corrosion on the Steel Electric hulls was discovered in 2007 inspections.  On November 20, 2007, the Washington State Secretary of Transportation, Paula Hammond, announced that Washington State Ferries (WSF) would pull all of the Steel Electric-class vessels out of service on that day. The decision closed the Port Townsend-Keystone route until WSF began to operate the high-speed passenger-only ferry Snohomish on the run starting November 23.

During November and December the Snohomish was pulled from this run and began a new interim service between Seattle and Port Townsend. This was done, in part, because there were many fewer visitors to Port Townsend during the holiday shopping season and it was hoped that a special run directly from Seattle would bring more visitors and shoppers to town. During this time, WSF got a third party to operate passenger only service on the PT-Keystone run, using a much smaller whale watch boat. The Snohomish was eventually put back on this run.

WSDOT spent $5 million on repairing the MV Quinault, and it passed Coast Guard inspection.  However, Governor Christine Gregoire believed that the money would be better used building new ferries, than repairing existing ferries and Secretary Hammond announced they were to be scrapped instead. All four of the ferries are berthed at the system's main storage facility in Eagle Harbor, Bainbridge Island. Governor Gregoire announced plans for their replacement, and the Washington State Legislature directed WSF to build new ferries to replace the Steel Electrics.  On February 14, 2008, Governor Gregoire signed Senate Bill 6794 into law, which authorized construction of replacement ferries. Despite several proposals to save the Steel Electrics, all four of the class were towed to Ensenada, Mexico in June 2009 for scrapping.

While new ferries were being built, the state leased the Steilacoom II, used by Pierce County's ferry system to cover the Port Townsend-Keystone run. This ferry was being utilized in preference to other state-owned ferries due to the restrictions the Keystone harbor imposes on the size of vessels serving that route.

The state had hoped that the first ferry would enter service in April 2009, however in early April 2008 the state rejected a bid of $26 million to build a ferry based on the Steilacoom II design as being too high. Reasons cited for the bid being $9 million over the state's estimate include the requirement that the shipbuilder complete the ferry within one year (or face stiff daily fines), and changes to the specifications including improved safety, security and quality. Washington State Ferries decided not to re-bid the project at the time.

The new vessels hold 64 autos, 1,200 passengers and up to 200 bicycles. The first vessel, was launched in January 2010 delivered to Washington State Ferries in June 2010. Bids for an additional 1 to 2 hulls of this class were to be received by the state in October 2010.

References

External links 
Washington State Ferries class information
Washington State Ferries history
Past vessels of the Washington State Ferry system at evergreenfleet.com
NYMET announces the acquisition of M/V Fresno and M/V San Leandro

Washington State Ferries vessel classes
1927 establishments in California
Ferries of California
San Francisco Bay
Hybrid electric vehicles
Electric boats
Puget Sound Navigation Company
Ferry classes